The State Duma of the Federal Assembly of the Russian Federation of the 1st convocation is a former convocation of the legislative branch of the State Duma, Lower House of the Russian Parliament, worked from December 12, 1993 – December 16, 1995. The first few months, the State Duma was located in the Comecon building on New Arbat Avenue, then moved to the State Duma building on Okhotny Ryad.

Leadership
On January 14, 1994, the parliament elected Agrarian Ivan Rybkin as the Chairman of the State Duma. Before his election, the session was moderated by the oldest deputy, 68 year-old Liberal Democrat Georgy Lukava.

Chairman election 
The first round was held on 13 January 1994 by rating voting using an open ballot. The runoff was conducted by secret ballot on the next day, before which Yury Vlasov endorsed Ivan Rybkin.

Factions and groups

Committees

23 committees operated in the State Duma of the 1st convocation.

Major legislation 
 Federal Constitutional Law "On the Constitutional Court" (21 July 1994)
 Civil Code of Russia (21 October 1994)
 Arbitration Procedure Code of Russia (5 April 1995)
 Federal Constitutional Law "On the referendum" (7 July 1995)
 Water Code of Russia (16 November 1995)
 Family Code of Russia (8 December 1995)

References

Convocations of the Russian State Duma
1st State Duma of the Russian Federation